Thomas Crossley Johnson was an American firearms designer. The son of a President of the Yale Safe and Iron Company, Johnson was trained as an industrial engineer and worked for several companies prior to employment with the Winchester Repeating Arms Company in 1885. While working for Winchester, Johnson was responsible for some of Winchester's most memorable gun designs:

 Model 1903, first commercially available rimfire self-loading rifle
 Model 1905, first commercially available centerfire self-loading rifle
 Model 1911, self-loading shotgun
 Model 12, slide action shotgun
 Model 21, double-barreled shotgun
 Model 51, "Imperial" bolt-action sporting rifle
 Model 52 bolt-action smallbore match rifle
 Model 54 bolt-action hunting rifle (which evolved into the renowned Model 70).

From beginning employment with Winchester in November 1885 to his death in 1934, Johnson was named on 124 patents assigned to the company.

Sources
   Madis, George, The Winchester Book. Houston: Art and Reference House 1971
   Williamson, Harold, Winchester, The Gun That Won the West. Washington: Combat Forces Press 1952

External links
 https://centerofthewest.org/2017/03/03/t-c-johnsons-bolt-action-experiments
 https://www.thefirearmblog.com/blog/2017/12/14/guns-t-c-johnson

1934 deaths
Firearm designers
1862 births